The Simons Laufer Mathematical Sciences Institute (SLMath), formerly the Mathematical Sciences Research Institute (MSRI), is an independent nonprofit mathematical research institution on the University of California campus in Berkeley, California. It is widely regarded as a world leading mathematical center for collaborative research, drawing thousands of leading researchers from around the world each year.

The institute was founded in 1982, and its funding sources include the National Science Foundation, private foundations, corporations, and more than 90 universities and institutions. The institute is located at 17 Gauss Way on the Berkeley campus, close to Grizzly Peak in the Berkeley Hills.

Because of its contribution to the nation's scientific potential, SLMath's activity is supported by the National Science Foundation and the National Security Agency.  Private individuals, foundations, and nearly 100 Academic Sponsor Institutions, including the top mathematics departments in the United States, provide crucial support and flexibility. James Simons, founder of Renaissance Technologies and a Berkeley alumnus, is a long-time supporter of the institute and serves on the board of trustees.

History 
The institute was founded in September 1982 by three Berkeley professors: Shiing-Shen Chern, Calvin Moore, and Isadore M. Singer. Shiing-Shen Chern acted as the founding director of the institute and Calvin Moore acted as the founding deputy director.

Originally located in Berkeley's extension building at 2223 Fulton Street, the institute moved into its current facility in the Berkeley hills on April 1, 1985. The institute initially paid rent to the university for its "Hill Campus" building, but since August 2000, it has occupied the building free of rent, just one of several contributions by the Berkeley campus.

In May 2022, the institute announced that it received an unrestricted $70 million gift from James and Marilyn Simons and Henry and Marsha Laufer. In honor of the endowment, MSRI was renamed the Simons Laufer Mathematical Sciences Institute.

Governance 
SLMath is governed by a board of trustees consisting of up to 35 elected members and seven ex-officio members: the director of the institute, the deputy director, the Chair of the Committee of Academic Sponsors, the co-Chairs of the Human Resources Advisory Committee and the co-Chairs of the Scientific Advisory Committee (SAC).

Unlike many mathematical institutes, SLMath has no permanent faculty or members, and its research activities are overseen by its Scientific Advisory Committee (SAC), a panel of distinguished mathematicians drawn from a variety of different areas of mathematical research. There are ten regular members in the SAC, and each member serves a four-year term and is elected by the board of trustees.

Research activities
SLMath hosts about 85 mathematicians and postdoctoral research fellows each semester for extended stays and holds programs and workshops, which draw approximately 2,000 visits by mathematical scientists throughout the year.  The visitors come to SLMath to work in an environment that promotes creativity and the effective interchange of ideas and techniques. SLMath features two focused programs each semester, attended by foremost mathematicians and postdocs from the United States and abroad; the institute has become a world center of activity in those fields.

SLMath takes advantage of its proximity to the Berkeley faculty and to the scientific talent and resources of Lawrence Berkeley National Laboratory; it also collaborates with organizations across the nation, including the Chicago Mercantile Exchange, Citadel LLC, IBM, and Microsoft Research. The institute's prize-winning forty-eight thousand square foot building has views of the San Francisco Bay. After 30 years of activity, the reputation of the institute is such that mathematicians make it a professional priority to participate in the institute's programs.

Education programs 

SLMath also serves a wider community through the development of human scientific capital, providing postdoctoral training to young scientists and increasing the diversity of the research workforce. The institute also advances the education of young people with conferences on critical issues in mathematics education. Additionally, they host research workshops that are unconnected to the main programs, such as its annual workshop on K-12 mathematics education Critical Issues in Mathematics Education.

During the summer, the institute holds workshops for graduate students. It also sponsors programs for middle and high school students and their teachers as part of the Math Circles and Circles for Teachers that meet weekly in San Francisco, Berkeley, and Oakland.  It also sponsors the Bay Area Mathematical Olympiad (BAMO), the Julia Robinson Mathematics Festival, and the U.S. team of young girls that competes at the China Girls Math Olympiad.

The lectures given at SLMath events are recorded and made available for free on the internet. SLMath has sponsored a number of events that reach out to the non-mathematical public, and its Simons Auditorium also hosts special performances of classical music. Mathematician Robert Osserman has held a series of public "conversations" with artists who have been influenced by mathematics in their work, such as composer Philip Glass, actor and writer Steve Martin, playwright Tom Stoppard, and actor and author Alan Alda.  SLMath also collaborates with local playwrights for an annual program of new short mathematics-inspired plays at Monday Night Playground at the Berkeley Repertory Theater, and co-sponsored a series of mathematics-inspired films with UC Berkeley's Pacific Film Archive for the institute's 20th anniversary. It also created a series of mathematical puzzles that were posted among the advertising placards on San Francisco Muni buses.

Mathical Book Prize
The Mathical Award is presented to books "that inspire children of all ages to see math in the world around them." Recipients of the award include John Rocco, Robie Harris, Jeffrey Kluger, Lauren Child, Michael J. Rosen, Leopoldo Gout, Elisha Cooper, Kate Banks, Gene Luen Yang, Steve Light, and Richard Evan Schwartz.

List of directors

References

External links 

MSRI streaming lectures
NSF Math Institutes

Mathematical institutes
National Science Foundation mathematical sciences institutes
Research institutes in California
Research institutes established in 1982
1982 establishments in California
Research institutes in the San Francisco Bay Area